Lobosphaera incisa, formerly Parietochloris incisa, is a fresh-water green algae. It is the richest plant source of the PUFA arachidonic acid.

References

Trebouxiales